Carlene Allen "Cardy" Raper (January 9, 1925 - September 5, 2019) was an American mycologist and science writer. She identified that the fungus Schizophyllum commune has over 23,000 mating types. She is regarded as one of the first women taxonomists in mycology. She was a Fellow of the American Association for the Advancement of Science.

Early life and education 
Raper wanted to be a scientist from the age of eight. She earned a master's degree in science at the University of Chicago in 1946. She worked on Achlya and Schizophyllum commune. She married her college supervisor, John (Red) Raper, in 1949. She earned her PhD in 1977.

Career 
Raper worked alongside her husband, Red Raper, on the mating-type mutants of Schizophyllum. Her husband was chair of the biology department at Harvard University when he died in 1974. After this, Cardy Raper began her formal career in science, working at Harvard University as a researcher and lecturer from 1974. She worked in the Netherlands at the University of Hagen with Jos Wessels. In 1978 she joined Wellesley College as an assistant professor. After spending the summer of 1982 working with Bob Ullrich at the University of Vermont, she decided to move there. In 1983 she set up her own independent research laboratory the University of Vermont. She remained there as an emeritus professor after her retirement in 1994. Raper identified that Schizophyllum commune had more than 23,000 mating types. In 2008 there was a celebration of her contributions to science. In 2012 she was elected as a Fellow of the American Association for the Advancement of Science.

In 2017 she spoke at the Burlington Writers Workshop. Her son, Jonathan Raper, is a professor of cell biology at the University of Pennsylvania. She and Red Raper also had a daughter, Linda. Raper died after a brief illness at her summer home in Ferrisburgh, Vermont, on September 5, 2019, at the age of 94.

Books

References 

Mycologists
American mycologists
Fellows of the American Association for the Advancement of Science
Wellesley College faculty
Harvard University faculty
University of Chicago alumni
University of Vermont alumni
Women mycologists
1925 births
2019 deaths